"Human Race" is a song by Canadian rock band Three Days Grace. The song was released on March 23, 2015, as the third single from the band's fifth studio album Human.

Background
In an interview with Loudwire, guitarist Barry Stock mentioned that "Human Race" was written while the band was on tour. Stock believed the song's inspiration was from the noise and traffic he saw during a drive through Salt Lake City. The song was nominated for "Rock Song of the Year" at the Loudwire Music Awards in 2015.

Release
An atmospheric version of "Human Race" was released on the deluxe edition of Human.

Music and lyric videos
A lyric video for the song was released on their YouTube channel on March 23, 2015.

The music video was released on May 14, 2015. It was directed by Mark Pellington.

Charts

Weekly charts

Year-end charts

References

2015 singles
2015 songs
Songs written by Barry Stock
Songs written by Neil Sanderson
Song recordings produced by Gavin Brown (musician)
Three Days Grace songs
Music videos directed by Mark Pellington
Songs written by Gavin Brown (musician)